Engaruka is an administrative ward in the Monduli district of the Arusha Region of Tanzania. According to the 2002 census, the ward has a total population of 7,295.

References

Monduli District
Wards of Arusha Region